Hernan Gregorio Pesquera (May 25, 1924 – September 8, 1982) was a United States district judge of the United States District Court for the District of Puerto Rico.

Education and career
Born in Santurce, Puerto Rico, Pesquera was in the United States Army during World War II, from 1940 to 1946. He received a Bachelor of Arts degree from the University of Puerto Rico in 1944 and a Bachelor of Laws from Cornell Law School in 1948. He was in private practice in San Juan, Puerto Rico from 1948 to 1949, and was then assistant chief of the Legal Department of the Puerto Rico Transport Authority until 1951, and manager and attorney of the Wholesale Merchants Association from 1951 to 1953. He returned to private practice in San Juan from 1953 to 1972, also serving as Chairman of the Puerto Rico Racing Board from 1971 to 1972.

Military service
Pesquera was a Platoon Sergeant in the United States Army, and also attended the United States Army Officers Candidate School at Fort Benning, Georgia from May 1944 to February 1945, when he received his commission as a Second Lieutenant. He was honorably discharged from active duty as a First Lieutenant. After his active service, he was a member of the United States Army Reserve from June 1946 until he retired as a Lieutenant Colonel in 1973. He received the Meritorious Service Medal on his retirement. The United States Army Reserve Center in Fort Allen, Puerto Rico is named after Pesquera.

Federal judicial service
On September 5, 1972, Pesquera was nominated by President Richard Nixon to a seat on the United States District Court for the District of Puerto Rico vacated by Judge Juan B. Fernandez-Badillo. Pesquera was confirmed by the United States Senate on October 12, 1972, and received his commission on October 17, 1972. He served as Chief Judge from 1980 until his death on September 8, 1982.

See also 
List of Hispanic/Latino American jurists

References

Sources

1924 births
1982 deaths
Cornell Law School alumni
Hispanic and Latino American judges
Judges of the United States District Court for the District of Puerto Rico
People from Santurce, Puerto Rico
Recipients of the Meritorious Service Medal (United States)
United States district court judges appointed by Richard Nixon
20th-century American judges
University of Puerto Rico alumni
United States Army reservists
United States Army officers
Puerto Rican military officers
United States Army personnel of World War II